The gymnastics competition at the 2013 European Youth Summer Olympic Festival was held from 16 to 19 July 2013 in Utrecht, Netherlands. At most three boys born 1996/1997 and girls born 1998/1999 or later from each country participated.

Medal summary

Medal table

Overall

Boys

Girls

Medal winners

Girls' Results

Team Final

All-Around Final

Vault Final

Uneven Bars Final

Balance Beam Final

Floor Exercise Final

References
Results

European Youth Summer Olympic Festival
2013 European Youth Summer Olympic Festival
2013
International gymnastics competitions hosted by the Netherlands